The Ulumbarra Theatre (/ʌlʌmbɹa/  ) is a 953 seat theater in Bendigo, Victoria.

The stage is in a Black box style and equipped with a fly system. It opened in 2015 and was estimated to cost $25,800,00 on the site of the Sandhurst Goal which closed in 2004. Bendigo Senior Secondary College and Ulumbarra Theatre share some amenities such as studios and a bar. Bendigo Venues and events administers this and several other cultural sites around Bendigo.

The word "Ulumbarra" comes from the Djadjawurrung word meaning "gather together" or "meeting place".

Awards
Performing Arts Connections Australian Venue of the Year 2017.

References

2015 establishments in Australia
Theatres in Victoria
Bendigo
Buildings and structures in Bendigo